Mount Nagishlamina is an 11,068-foot (3,374 meter) glaciated mountain summit located in the Tordrillo Mountains of the Alaska Range, in the US state of Alaska. It is the fifth-highest peak in the Tordrillo Mountains, a subset of the Alaska Range. The mountain takes its Denaʼina language name from the Nagishlamina River which drains the west side of the peak. Mount Nagishlamina's name was in use by local mountaineers since the 1970s, and was officially adopted in 1999 by the U.S. Board on Geographic Names. This geographic feature was likely the highest unclimbed peak in the United States at the time of its first ascent in 1989 by Dave Johnston.

Climate

Based on the Köppen climate classification, Mount Nagishlamina is located in a subarctic climate zone, with long, cold, snowy winters, and cool summers. Temperatures can drop below −20 °C with wind chill factors below −30 °C. This climate supports the Harpoon and Capps Glaciers surrounding the peak. Precipitation runoff from the mountain and meltwater from its glaciers empties into Cook Inlet. The months May through June offer the most favorable weather for viewing or climbing the peak.

See also

List of mountain peaks of Alaska
Geography of Alaska

References

External links
 Weather forecast: Mount Nagishlamina
 Mt. Nagishlamina and Mt. Chichantna: Wikimedia photo

Nagishlamina
Nagishlamina
Nagishlamina
Nagishlamina
Denaʼina